God's Country and the Man is a 1931 American Western film directed by John P. McCarthy and written by McCarthy, Wellyn Totman and Alan Bridge. Distributed by State Rights and Syndicate Pictures, the film was released in the US on May 1, 1931.

Cast 
Tom Tyler as Tex
Betty Mack as Rose
Alan Bridge as Livermore
Ted Adams as Romero
George Hayes as Stingeree Kelly
Julian Rivero as General Pedro Gomez
Wm. Bertram
John Elliott

References

External links 
 
 

Films directed by John P. McCarthy
American Western (genre) films
1930 Western (genre) films
1930 films
American black-and-white films
1930s American films